The Alfrey-Brown House (also known as the Lawson House) is a historic house located at 1001 South Washington Street in Siloam Springs, Arkansas, United States.

Description and history 
It is an imposing -story wood-framed residence, with a hip roof pierced by large gable projections, and a porch that wraps around three sides. Although the outside has the cleaner lines of the Colonial Revival, the building's interior is richly decorated with Queen Anne-style woodwork. The house was built in 1905 by Thomas Alfrey, a local builder, and was for many years home to a John Brown, a prominent local evangelist.

The house was listed on the National Register of Historic Places on October 4, 1984.

See also
National Register of Historic Places listings in Benton County, Arkansas

References

Houses on the National Register of Historic Places in Arkansas
Colonial Revival architecture in Arkansas
Houses completed in 1905
Houses in Benton County, Arkansas
National Register of Historic Places in Benton County, Arkansas
1905 establishments in Arkansas